Dwight Waller Sr. (October 5, 1945 – March 12, 2021) was an American professional basketball player. He played in the National Basketball Association for the Atlanta Hawks and in the American Basketball Association for the Denver Rockets.

After graduating from Tennessee State University in 1967, Waller spent the 1967–68 season playing for Nashville, Tennessee's Amateur Athletic Union team.

Waller died on March 12, 2021.

References

1945 births
2021 deaths
Amateur Athletic Union men's basketball players
American men's basketball players
Atlanta Hawks draft picks
Atlanta Hawks players
Basketball players from Tennessee
Denver Rockets players
People from Brownsville, Tennessee
Small forwards
Tennessee State Tigers basketball players